Maltese Braille is the braille alphabet of the Maltese language. It was in the news in 2005 with the publication of the first braille Bible in Maltese.

Chart
The alphabet is as follows.  (See Maltese alphabet.)  Ż has the form of international y.

This chart is different than UNESCO (2013) The above chart is based on a file sent by
This chart is from Michael Micallef of the Malta Information Technology Agency 

What is in World Braille Usage 2013 appears to be an old proposal that was never implemented, one which followed the sounds of the letters of the print alphabet rather than the actual letters.

References

French-ordered braille alphabets
Maltese language